Salim Barjum (born 25 July 1952) is a Colombian diver. He competed at the 1968 Summer Olympics and the 1972 Summer Olympics.

References

1952 births
Living people
Colombian male divers
Olympic divers of Colombia
Divers at the 1968 Summer Olympics
Divers at the 1972 Summer Olympics
Sportspeople from Cali
20th-century Colombian people